Wellsville is a borough in York County, Pennsylvania, United States. The population was 299 at the 2020 census.

History
Wellsville changed very little visually during the twentieth century; the borough's appearance has remained that of a nineteenth-century community, complete with brick sidewalks and Gothic Revival and Greek Revival houses.  
 
Because of its unusually high quality of preservation, nearly all of the community was placed on the National Register of Historic Places in 1977 as the "Wellsville Historic District".  Among the district's 48 contributing properties are an 1850s Methodist church, a small group of nineteenth-century commercial buildings, and the Wellsville House, an 1870s structure that has been used as a factory, museum, and restaurant.

Geography
Wellsville is located at  (40.050335, -76.940533).

Demographics

As of the census of 2000, there were 279 people, 118 households, and 78 families residing in the borough. The population density was 2,004.1 people per square mile (769.4/km2). There were 124 housing units at an average density of 890.7 per square mile (342.0/km2). The racial makeup of the borough was 97.13% White, 1.43% African American, 1.08% Asian, and 0.36% from two or more races.

There were 118 households, out of which 34.7% had children under the age of 18 living with them, 52.5% were married couples living together, 8.5% had a female householder with no husband present, and 33.1% were non-families. 27.1% of all households were made up of individuals, and 11.0% had someone living alone who was 65 years of age or older. The average household size was 2.36 and the average family size was 2.85.

In the borough the population was spread out, with 22.6% under the age of 18, 6.8% from 18 to 24, 31.9% from 25 to 44, 21.9% from 45 to 64, and 16.8% who were 65 years of age or older. The median age was 40 years. For every 100 females there were 103.6 males. For every 100 females age 18 and over, there were 105.7 males.

The median income for a household in the borough was $43,750, and the median income for a family was $51,667. Males had a median income of $33,281 versus $25,313 for females. The per capita income for the borough was $17,689. About 7.7% of families and 9.0% of the population were below the poverty line, including 12.2% of those under the age of eighteen and 9.8% of those 65 or over.

See also
Wellsville Borough Park

References

External links

Historic districts on the National Register of Historic Places in Pennsylvania
Populated places established in 1737
Boroughs in York County, Pennsylvania
1892 establishments in Pennsylvania
Articles containing video clips
National Register of Historic Places in York County, Pennsylvania